Bobby Kent (né Khayam; 1973 – July 14, 1993) was an Iranian-American man who was murdered by seven people, including his best friend,  Martin Joseph "Marty" Puccio, Jr (born March 21, 1973) in Weston, Florida.  The murder would be adapted into the 2001 film Bully.

Events before the murder
Bobby Kent, the son of Iranian immigrants Fred and Farah Kent (originally surnamed Khayam), attended South Broward High School in the South Florida suburb of Hollywood, Florida. According to Tim Donnelly, who prosecuted all the conspirators for this murder, one attorney described Kent as "like Eddie Haskell. All the parents loved him in the neighborhood, but the kids looked at him a different way."

Marty Puccio is an Italian-American, and was raised Catholic. Kent and Puccio had known each other since third grade, had lived on the same block in Hollywood, Florida since that time, and were good friends as teenagers. Bad blood, however, existed between the two. Puccio felt "ill-will and hatred" towards Kent, who would bully and pummel him.

Both sets of parents were wary of the friendship as well. Puccio's parents, Martin Sr. and Veronica, were concerned because Marty often returned from being with Kent bleeding or covered in bruises. Fred Kent thought of Puccio as a wayward slacker who had no future (Puccio was a high school dropout) and felt the friendship with his son would destroy the future he was helping him build. Frequent gym-goers, both boys were rumored to use steroids, which, in Kent's case, according to testimonial accounts, significantly contributed to his erratic, aggressive behavior.

Kent and Puccio had experimented with making gay porn movies, hoping to distribute them to local shops. Neither Kent nor Puccio actually participated in these movies, but, rather, allegedly directed them and coaxed a Florida man in his 40s to perform on camera. Kent tried to peddle a movie, titled Rough Boys, to porn shops across South Florida. None took him up on the offer, due to the poor audio and video quality as well as the lack of any sexual activities in the film beyond the man dancing nude and playing with a dildo.

Murder
Toward the beginning of 1993, Puccio (aged 20) began dating Lisa Connelly (aged 18). Frustrated by how much time Puccio spent with Kent (aged 20) as well as Kent's treatment of Puccio, Connelly tried to distract Kent from Puccio by setting up her friend Alice "Ali" Willis (aged 17) with Kent. Kent and Willis dated for a few weeks, but she ultimately ended the relationship because he was abusive. In June, Puccio confided to Connelly that Kent had been abusive to him quite often over the years. Connelly tried to convince him to end the friendship, but Puccio seemed hesitant. By this time, Connelly knew she was pregnant with Puccio's child, and was determined to pursue a permanent relationship with him.

Allegedly, Connelly decided that Kent needed to be eliminated permanently, and began talking to Puccio and other friends about murdering him. On July 13, 1993, Connelly called Willis and told her that "Bobby Kent was planning to come to Palm Bay, Florida, where Willis was living, to murder her and smother her baby [by a previous relationship], unless she returned to Broward County to date him again." Willis claimed Connelly asked her to come to Connelly's house to discuss murdering Bobby Kent. Willis went to Connelly's house and brought two friends, her current boyfriend, Donald Semenec (aged 17), and Heather Swallers (aged 18).

On the night of July 13, 1993, Puccio, Semenec, Swallers, Connelly and Willis met with Kent. Puccio, Semenec, and Swallers became uncomfortable and left. Connelly and Willis lured Kent to a new development under construction with the promise that he would be able to drive Willis' Mustang 5.0 and have sex with her. Connelly had brought along her mother's pistol, intending to kill Kent while he was distracted by sexual activity with Willis, but was unable to go through with shooting him.

Despite the failed attempt, Connelly still wanted Kent dead. Seeking assistance, she contacted a self-proclaimed hitman named Derek Kaufman (aged 20), who had been recommended by a friend of Willis'. The group met Kaufman at his home in Rolling Oaks, Florida. They wanted him to get a gun so they could kill Kent that night, but Kaufman told them he couldn't procure a weapon that quickly. Willis, Connelly, Semenec and Swallers then went back to Connelly's house and were joined by her cousin, Derek Dzvirko (aged 19). The group continued to discuss their plans, and ultimately decided to go ahead with murdering Kent the next night, with Kaufman's assistance. 

Late on the night of July 14, 1993, the seven joined together at Puccio's house and finalized their plans. Puccio contacted Kent and convinced him to come out with the group that night, with the promise that they would race their cars and that Willis wanted to have sex with him again. The group assembled their weapons: between them, they had two knives, a lead pipe, and a baseball bat. Around 11:30 p.m., they picked Kent up from his home and headed out to a construction site.

When they arrived at the site, Willis, in accordance with the plan, took Kent off to a secluded spot where they were talking. Swallers joined them there. While she and Willis distracted Kent, Semenec came up and stabbed Kent in the back of the neck with a knife. When Kent asked for Puccio's help, Puccio stuck a knife in Kent's stomach. Kent yelled out an apology, but Puccio continued to stab him. When Kent tried to flee, Puccio, Semenec, and Derek Kaufman followed him and continued wounding him. Puccio then slit Kent's throat and hit his head against the ground. Kaufman then approached and hit Kent in the head with the baseball bat, which was the final blow. After this, Dzvirko, Semenec, Puccio, and Kaufman helped dump Kent's body on the edge of the shore of the marsh, in the belief that alligators would eat the decaying body.

Aftermath 
In the days following the crime, many of the conspirators confessed to various other people. Connelly confessed to her mother, who contacted her sister, Dzvirko's mother. Together, they took Connelly and Dzvirko to see their brother, Joe Scrima, who had friends in the police department and who they thought would know what to do. Scrima's friends put them in touch with Detective Frank Illaraza of the Broward County Sheriff's Office, and a cooperative Dzvirko confessed everything. As proof, he led Illaraza to Kent's body.

Adjudications
Martin Puccio was charged with first-degree murder and originally was sentenced to death by electrocution on August 3, 1995. In 1997, the Supreme Court of Florida ruled that Puccio should not be executed due to mitigating factors, so his death sentence was commuted to life in prison, with parole eligibility occurring in 25 years. He remains in custody at the Desoto Annex in Arcadia, Florida.
Donald Semenec was sentenced to life in prison, plus a concurrent 15-year sentence for conspiracy. He remains in custody at Lake Correctional Institution in Clermont, Florida.
Derek Kaufman was sentenced to life in prison without parole for 25 years, plus a concurrent 30-year sentence for conspiracy. He remains in custody in the Tomoka Correctional Institution near Daytona, Florida.
Lisa Connelly initially was sentenced to life in prison without the possibility of parole. Her sentence was overturned on appeal as unduly harsh, and was reduced in 1998 to 22 years. After having served only 9 years, she was released in February 2004.
Alice Willis was charged with second-degree murder and sentenced to 40 years' imprisonment and 40 years' probation on May 19, 1995. The sentence was reduced on appeal to 17 years. Willis was released from secure custody in September 2001, but remains on probation.
Derek Dzvirko pleaded guilty to second-degree murder. He was sentenced to 11 years in prison. He was released from custody in October 1999. 
Heather Swallers pleaded guilty to second-degree murder and was sentenced to seven years in prison. She was released from custody in February 1998.

In popular culture
The murder resulted in a best-selling true crime book in 1998, Bully: A True Story of High School Revenge, written by Jim Schutze. Publishers Weekly stated that it was "A chilling tale" and that Schutze "captured the mindset of the intellectually and emotionally shallow killers". Schutze worked for the Houston Chronicle.

The book was adapted by David McKenna (credited under the pseudonym "Zachary Long" after he demanded his name be removed from the film) and Roger Pullis into the 2001 film Bully, directed by Larry Clark. In the film, Kent was portrayed by Nick Stahl, Puccio was portrayed by Brad Renfro, Willis was portrayed by Bijou Phillips, Connelly was portrayed by Rachel Miner, Semenec was portrayed by Michael Pitt, Swallers was portrayed by Kelli Garner, Dzvirko was portrayed by Daniel Franzese, and Kaufman was portrayed by Leo Fitzpatrick.

The story was covered on American Justice, Forensic Files, and Murder Among Friends. The Forensic Files episode contains an interview with Derek Dzvirko about the murder.

Notes

References
 Schutze, Jim. Bully: Does Anyone Deserve to Die?
 HarperCollins, February 1, 1998. , 9780380723331. Available from Google Books
 William Morrow and Company, 1997. , Available from the Internet Archive

External links

Decision on Appeal leading to vacating the Death Penalty. 
Richey, Warren. "Man, 22, Gets Life Sentence For Role In Kent Murder." Sun-Sentinel. June 13, 1995.
Sewell, Dan. "Murder Bares Sordid Teen Culture : Crime: Death probe unveils a suburban network involved in prostitution, pornography and robbery." Los Angeles Times. August 15, 1993.

1993 in Florida
1993 murders in the United States
1990s crimes in Florida
1990s trials
History of Broward County, Florida
Bullying in the United States
Deaths by beating in the United States
Deaths by person in Florida
Deaths by stabbing in Florida
July 1993 crimes
July 1993 events in the United States
Murder committed by minors
Murder in Florida
Murder trials
Place of birth missing
Kent, Bobby
20th-century American trials